Fatululic (Fatu-Lulik, Fatululik), officially Fatululic Administrative Post, is an administrative post (and was formerly a subdistrict) in Cova Lima municipality, East Timor. Its seat or administrative centre is Fatululic.

The population of the administrative post is 1.894 (2010).

The administrative post comprises two Sucos:

 Fatululic, consisting of aldeias of Aitoun, Beco, and Beidasi.
 Taroman, consisting of aldeias of Fatuloro, Holba, Lia Nain, Macous, and Taroman.

References

External links 

  – information page on Ministry of State Administration site 

Administrative posts of East Timor
Cova Lima Municipality